Henry Derek Elis (born Henry Derek Bonner; March 8, 1978) is an American musician best known as the lead vocalist for the extreme metal band Act of Defiance from Los Angeles and as a solo country music artist.

Early life 

Henry Derek Elis (née Bonner) was born in Milledgeville, Georgia on March 8, 1978. Raised by his grandmother, Henry Derek grew up next to Central State Hospital, Georgia's state mental asylum. His music career began in 1995 when he relocated to Atlanta, Georgia and formed the black gothic metal band Lilitu. Henry Derek later joined the Sweet Meat Love & Holy Cult folk collective, releasing acoustic-based folk music under the moniker To The Boy Elis before moving to Los Angeles, California.

Career

Scar the Martyr 

Slipknot drummer Joey Jordison formed heavy metal band Scar the Martyr in April 2013. On June 21, 2013, the full lineup was announced, with Henry Derek as lead vocalist. Elis left the band a year later due to creative and personal differences. Elis appears on the band's debut album, Scar the Martyr, released on October 1, 2013, via Roadrunner Records.

Thrown into Exile, Act of Defiance 

On December 25, 2014, it was announced that Henry Derek was the new vocalist for the metal band Thrown into Exile. He then formed the heavy metal super-group, Act of Defiance, with Chris Broderick and Shawn Drover, both former members of Megadeth, and Matt Bachand of Shadows Fall in February 2015. Act of Defiance embarked on their first European tour in summer, 2018.

QAALM 

On July 14, 2019, it was announced that Henry Derek Elis was playing lead guitar in a new Los Angeles based Doom band Qaalm. Qaalm made a stream of there demo available on Bandcamp and consists of Pete Majors Ex Harassor – Lead Vocals,  Henry Derek Elis – Lead Guitar, Christopher Jon Ex I, Parasite- Keys & Samples, Brock Elmore – Guitar & Backing Vocals, David Huet – Bass and Etay Levy – Drums.

Solo career 

Henry Derek Elis released his EP, Don't Look, on September 14, 2018, followed by his debut solo album, The Devil Is My Friend, on October 26, 2018. Elis sings, plays banjo, mandolin, bass, organ, dobro, classical, baritone, acoustic and electric guitars. The album also includes contributions from Aubrey Richmond & John Schreffler Jr. (Shooter Jennings), Jarboe (Swans), Tara Vanflower (Lycia), Neal Tiemann (DevilDriver), and Sera Timms (Black Mare). On October 12, 2018, reporter Robert Crawford included Henry Derek's song, "What's Left of Us", in Rolling Stone's 10 Best Country and Americana Songs of the Week writing, "Elis delivers this haunting, minor-key barn-burner like a carnival barker who's gone hoarse, framing his Tom Waits-ish growl with swirls of fiddle and pedal steel. A Southern gothic standout from his new release, The Devil Is My Friend, "What's Left of Us" is gravely and graveyard-worthy — the perfect soundtrack for mid-October."

Bands 

 Lilitu (1995–2004)
 Crying for Winter (1997)
 Blood Promise (2006–2007)
 Scar the Martyr (2013–2014)
 Thrown into Exile (2014–2017)
 Act of Defiance (2014–present)
 Qaalm (2019–present)
 Caveflowers (2019–present)

Discography

Solo albums 
 The Devil Is My Friend (2018)
 Don't Look (EP, 2018)
 All the Pretty Little Horses (EP, 2020)

Lilitu 
 Servants of Twilight (1997)
 The Earth Gods (2000)
 Memorial (2001)
 The Delores Lesion (2004)

Crying for Winter 
 Crying for Winter (1997)

Blood Promise 
 Demo 2006 (2006)
 Demo 2007 (2007)

To the Boy Elis 
 Love Is Like the Cost of Livin''' (2008)

 Scar the Martyr 
 Revolver EP (2013)
 Metal Hammer EP (2013)
 Scar the Martyr (2013)

 Thrown into Exile 
 Safe Inside (2016)

 Act of Defiance 
 Birth and the Burial (2015)
 Old Scars, New Wounds'' (2017)

References

External links 
 

American male songwriters
1978 births
Living people
Gothic country musicians
20th-century American singers
21st-century American singers
20th-century American male singers
21st-century American male singers